Samuel Howe Barnes (1808 – November 13, 1860, in Norwich, Chenango County, New York) was an American politician from New York.

Life
He married Harriet Pellet and they had six children.

On November 6, 1860, he was elected a Canal Commissioner on the Republican ticket, but died a week later, before the beginning of his term.

Sources
 Chenango County Civil List, at RootsWeb
The New York Civil List compiled by Franklin Benjamin Hough, Stephen C. Hutchins and Edgar Albert Werner (1867; page 406)
 History of Norwich, Chenango Co.
 The tickets, in NYT on November 5, 1860

1808 births
1860 deaths
People from Norwich, New York
Erie Canal Commissioners
New York (state) Republicans